Victory Bell may refer to:

 Blue Key Victory Bell, awarded to the winner of the football game between Ball State University and Indiana State University
 Victory Bell (Miami–Cincinnati), awarded to the winner of the football game between the University of Cincinnati and Miami University
 Victory Bell (Duke–North Carolina), awarded to the winner of the football game between Duke University and the University of North Carolina at Chapel Hill
 Governor's Victory Bell, awarded to the winner of the football  game between the University of Minnesota and Pennsylvania State University
 Victory Bell, awarded to the winner of the Missouri–Nebraska football game
 Victory Bell (UCLA–USC), awarded to the winner of the football game between the University of Southern California and the University of California, Los Angeles
 Victory Bell (University of Portland), Oregon, two bells rung for sporting and other events
 Victory Bell, rung by Fordham University football players
 Victory Bell, rung by Washington State University football players
 Victory Bell, former rivalry trophy of Cal Poly and Fresno State and currently rung at Cal Poly football games after scores
 Victory Bell, former football rivalry trophy of Santa Clara and Saint Mary's

See also
 Victreebel, a carnivorous Pokémon based on the pitcher plant